Amor a la medida, (English: "Tailored Love") also known as El sastre, (English: "The Tailor") is a 1993 Mexican musical romantic drama film directed by Raúl Araiza and starring Los Tigres del Norte. It features a plot based on the 1950 Mexican film Vagabunda.

It is the last feature film that Los Tigres del Norte starred in after appearing in films since 1978; subsequent productions they would appear in were recordings of their concerts.

Plot
The musical band Los Tigres del Norte record an album. During the recordings, one of the members watches the film Vagabunda on television. Afterwards, he gets involved in a love affair with a woman with a dark past. At the end, it is revealed that the events of the film were a dream that the bandmember had after having fallen asleep while watching Vagabunda, whose plot is similar to his affair with the woman from his dream.

Cast
Los Tigres del Norte
Jorge Hernández as Jorge
Hernán Hernández as Hernán
Raúl Hernández as Raul
Eduardo Hernández Moncada as Eduardo
Óscar Lara as Oscar
Julieta Rosen as María Elena
Claudia Guzmán as Vicky
Humberto Elizondo as Ernesto Franco
Raúl Padilla "Chóforo" as Ulises
Bruno Rey as Gonzalo
Alberto Pedret as León
Ignacio Retes as Don Nacho
César Sobrevals
Paco Stanley as himself
Victor Tolosa
Ruben Cuellar
Patricia Mayer
Martha Covarrubias

References

External links

1993 films
1990s Spanish-language films
1990s romantic musical films
1993 romantic drama films
Mexican musical films
Mexican romantic drama films
1990s Mexican films